This is a list of instruments by Hornbostel-Sachs number, covering those instruments that are classified under 11 under that system. These instruments are directly struck idiophones.

References

 http://www.music.vt.edu/musicdictionary/texti/Idiophone.html
 https://web.archive.org/web/20110605070024/http://www.let.uu.nl/~Rudolf.Rasch/personal/Muziekinstrumenten03.PDF
 http://www.wesleyan.edu/vim/svh.html

Notes

Lists of musical instruments by Hornbostel–Sachs number
Lists of percussion instruments